Young Lochinvar is a 1923 British silent historical drama film directed by W. P. Kellino and starring Owen Nares, Gladys Jennings, and Dick Webb. The screenplay was based on J. E. Muddock’s 1896 novel Young Lochinvar, A Tale of the Border Country, which was based on Canto V, XII of the poem Marmion by Walter Scott.

Plot
In 15th century Scotland, a young knight, Lochinvar,  was betrothed from birth to Cecilia, daughter of Johnstone of Lockwood. Helen is betrothed to Musgrave, a man she does not love. Lochinvar and Helen meet and fall in love, and Musgrave is wounded by Cecilia's brother Alick. Helen doesn't want to marry Musgrave, and as the date of her wedding draws near she sends a message to Lochinvar to help her.

Lochinvar arrives at Helen's wedding, asking for a dance. He sweeps her off her feet and onto his horse, and rides away with her. The couple are married at Lochinvar's home. Helen's family follows, and threaten violence, but Musgrave arrives, states that Lochinvar and Helen are in love, and he wishes them a happy life.

Cast
 Owen Nares as Lochinvar
 Gladys Jennings as Ellen Graeme
 Dick Webb as Musgrave
 Cecil Morton York as Johnstone
 Charles Barratt as Alick Johnstone
 Bertie Wright as Brookie
 Lionel Braham as Jamie the Ox
 Dorothy Harris as Cecilia Johnstone
 J. Nelson Ramsay as Graeme

References

Bibliography
 Low, Rachael. History of the British Film, 1918–1929. George Allen & Unwin, 1971.

External links

1924 films
British historical drama films
1920s historical drama films
British silent feature films
1920s English-language films
Films directed by W. P. Kellino
Films set in Scotland
Films based on poems
Stoll Pictures films
Films shot at Cricklewood Studios
British black-and-white films
1924 drama films
1920s British films
Silent drama films